Carola Reyna (born 15 April 1962) is an Argentine actress and director from Buenos Aires. She has won the ACE Award and the Martin Fierro Awards five times.

Biography

Daughter of TV Producer Eduardo Reyna, she grew up in Argentina, Spain and Venezuela. She studied theatre with Carlos Moreno, Augusto Fernandes, Juan Carlos Gené and Carlos Gandolfo during 1983 to 1986.

Made her debut in the 1980s with Noël Coward's Hay Fever directed by China Zorrilla and Anton Chekhov's The Seagull at the Teatro San Martín.

She is married to actor Boy Olmi since 1994.

Filmography

Television
 Tal como somos (1984)
 Extraños y Amantes (1985) as Ana María
 Pasión (1990)
 El Oro y el Barro (1992)
 Algunas Mujeres (1992)
 Apasionada (1993) as Claudia
 Nueve Lunas (1995)
 Señoras y Señores (1997) as Lucía
 Ricos y Famosos (1997)
 Gasoleros (1998)
 Casa Natal (1998)
 Tiempofinal (2000) as Clara
 El Solero de Mi Vida (2001) as Leonor Muzzopappa
 Máximo Corazón (2002) as Teresa Quinteros
 ¿Quién es Alejandro Chomski? (2002) as herself
 Sol Negro (2003) as Sabrina de Bustos
 Los Simuladores (2003–2004)
 La Niñera (2004) as Tete
 Amas de Casa Desesperadas (2006) as Vera Sherer
 4x4 (2008)
 Esperanza mía (2015)

Film
 El Hombre de la Deuda Externa (1987)
 El Color Escondido (1988) as Helena
 Cuatro caras para Victoria (1992) as Victoria
 Copyright (1993)
 Beautiful (1993)
 El Amante de las Películas Mudas (1994) as Clara
 Casas de Fuego (1995) as Jeanette
 Carlos Monzón, el Segundo Juicio (1996) as Alicia Muñiz
 Vidas Privadas (2001) as Roxana Rodó
 Las Caras de la Luna (2002) as Shosh Balsher
 India Pravile (2003) as Lucila
 La Puta y la Ballena (2004) as Meme
 El Fuego y el Soñador (2005) as Women of Rose

Director
 ¿Quién es el Jefe? (2005)

References

External links 
 
 Carola Reyna at Spanish IMDb.

Argentine film actresses
Argentine telenovela actresses
Living people
People from Buenos Aires
1962 births
20th-century Argentine actresses
21st-century Argentine actresses